George J. Costigan (born 8 August 1947) is an English actor who is best known for portraying Bob in the 1987 film Rita, Sue and Bob Too and for roles in TV series such as Happy Valley and So Haunt Me.

Early life
Born in Portsmouth, Hampshire, Costigan grew up in Salford, Greater Manchester. After attending St Augustine's C of E Primary School on Bolton Road in Pendlebury, he went to Wardley Grammar School on Mardale Avenue in Wardley near Swinton.

Career
Costigan has appeared regularly on television since 1978. He played Tom Towers in the 1982 series of The Barchester Chronicles, an adaption of the novels by Anthony Trollope, and in the same year starred as Tom Hannaway in a BBC adaptation of Fame is the Spur. In 1984, he appeared as lead guest actor playing Wilson Kemp in The Greek Interpreter, an episode of the successful Granada TV series The Adventures of Sherlock Holmes, and, in the same year, also played Philip the Bastard in the BBC Television Shakespeare production of The Life and Death of King John (alongside Leonard Rossiter in the title role).

In 1986, he played the lead role of Bob, an adulterous businessman in the small independent comedy film Rita, Sue and Bob Too, which has since achieved cult status. He has since starred or featured in many television productions, including The Adventures of Sherlock Holmes (channelling Peter Lorre) Kavanagh QC, Coogan's Run, Connie, A Touch of Frost, Inspector Morse, Murder Most Horrid, So Haunt Me, London's Burning, The Bill, Holby City, The Long Firm, City Central, Vera, Dalziel and Pascoe, The Ruth Rendell Mysteries, The Inspector Lynley Mysteries, The Beiderbecke Connection, New Tricks, Linda Green and Casualty. His film work includes Calendar Girls and Shirley Valentine.

He has appeared in the role of Max Capricorn in the 2007 Doctor Who Christmas special, Voyage of the Damned.

In 1974, he joined the Liverpool Everyman Theatre Company, where he met his second wife, Jooles, remaining with the company for eight years.Whilst at the Everyman he appeared as Bert in the Willy Russell Musical "John, Paul, George, Ringo and Bert" alongside Trevor Eve, Anthony Sher and Bernard Hill.

In the theatre, he created the role of Mickey Johnstone in Willy Russell's musical Blood Brothers, originally at the Liverpool Playhouse, and later at the Lyric Theatre, London. He then played the role of Estragon in Samuel Beckett's play Waiting for Godot at the Manchester Library Theatre for three weeks from 16 February to 8 March 2008, and played Willy Loman in Arthur Miller's Death of a Salesman at York Theatre Royal in November 2008. In December 2009, it was announced that he is to join Emmerdale as a friend of Rodney Blackstock. He made his debut in the soap in March 2010 and his last appearance was shown on 23 July 2010.  On 4/5 April 2010, he starred as Alan, the ex-husband of Christine, Inspector Frost's new love interest in A Touch of Frost. In 2012 he appeared in William Shakespeare's King Lear at the Citizens Theatre, Glasgow, alongside David Hayman. In 2014, he appeared in Happy Valley. He resumed the role, Nevison Gallagher, in the 2016 series. He also starred in the hit TV series Line of Duty as Patrick Fairbank.

In July 2016 he played Sir Ethelred in the BBC's 3-part television adaptation of Joseph Conrad's 1907 novel The Secret Agent.

His first novel The Single Soldier was published in Spring 2017. The second and third parts of the trilogy, The Soldier's Home are also published via Urbane Publishers.

George is patron of the Dark Horse Theatre Company.

Personal life
His partner is the writer Julia North, with whom he wrote a 1990 episode of Birds of a Feather. They have three sons. He supports Everton FC.

Filmography

Film

Television

References

External links
 
 George Costigan CV
 "George returns to home", 2002 profile in the Salford Advertiser

Living people
Male actors from Salford
People educated at Worsley Wardley Grammar School
20th-century English male actors
21st-century English male actors
English male film actors
English male stage actors
1947 births